Martha Leticia Sosa Govea (born November 25, 1950) is a Mexican politician from Colima affiliated with the National Action Party who has served as municipal president (mayor) of the city of Manzanillo and as senator.

In 2006 she was elected to serve in the Senate of Mexico for a six-year term. She left the Senate to run for Governor of the state of Colima. In 2009 she was designated the PAN candidate for the 2009 Colima state election.  Sosa was defeated by the PRI candidate.

External links

References 

Politicians from Colima
Municipal presidents in Colima
Members of the Senate of the Republic (Mexico)
National Action Party (Mexico) politicians
Women members of the Senate of the Republic (Mexico)
Women mayors of places in Mexico
1950 births
Living people
21st-century Mexican politicians
21st-century Mexican women politicians